The Caribbean Premier League (abbreviated to CPL or CPLT20) is an annual Twenty20 cricket tournament held in the Caribbean. It was founded by Cricket West Indies in 2013 to replace the Caribbean Twenty20 as the premier Twenty20 competition in the Caribbean. It is currently sponsored by Hero MotoCorp and consequently officially named the Hero CPL. The inaugural tournament was won by the Jamaica Tallawahs, who defeated the Guyana Amazon Warriors in the final. 

In cricket, a five-wicket haul (also known as a "five-for" or "fifer") refers to a bowler taking five or more wickets in a single innings. This is regarded as a notable achievement. The first five-wicket haul was taken by Shakib Al Hasan of the Barbados Tridents against the Trinidad & Tobago Red Steel on 3 August 2013. Shakib captured 6 wickets for 6 runs, which was also the best bowling figures in an innings by a player in this competition. The most recent five-wicket haul was taken by Mohammad Nabi of the St Lucia Zouks against the St Kitts and Nevis Patriots on 27 August 2020. Sohail Tanvir's fifer for 3 runs was the most economical five-wicket haul, who picked up five wickets with an economy rate of 0.75 and bowling average of 0.60, against the Barbados Tridents, on 29 August 2017. David Wiese of the Guyana Amazon Warriors took the least economical five-wicket haul, bowling at an economic rate of 7.50. Among the West Indians, Fidel Edwards of the Trinidad & Tobago Red Steel was the first bowler to pick up a five-wicket haul in this tournament.

Shakib Al Hasan is also the youngest player to claim a five-wicket haul in this competition, when he bagged a five-for for the first time in the CPL, at the age of 26. On the other hand, on 26 September 2019, Hayden Walsh Jr. became the youngest native player to pick up a five-wicket haul in the Caribbean Premier League, when he claimed 5 wickets for 15 runs, at the age of 27.

The 2013 season and 2015 season saw the highest number of five-wicket hauls in a season. Two five-wicket hauls were taken in each of those seasons. No bowler could take a five-for in the 2014 and 2016 seasons. Dwayne Bravo is the only player to take a five-wicket haul while captaining his side. Bravo captained the Trinidad & Tobago Red Steel, and picked up 5 wickets for 23 runs, on 24 July 2015 against the Jamaica Tallawahs.

Key

Five-wicket hauls

Season overview

References

External links 

 Official website of Caribbean Premier League

Caribbean Premier League
West Indian cricket lists